The Lake Turkana sardine (Chelaethiops bibie) is an African species of freshwater fish in the family Cyprinidae. It is found in the Nile River and Webi Shebeli, and in the Niger, Bénoué and Volta basin.

References

Chelaethiops
Fish described in 1835